Maria Laura Rocca (5 October 1917 – 6 May 1999) was an Italian actress and writer.

Life and career 
Born Maria Laura Gayno in Pasian di Prato,  Udine,  Rocca spent her adolescence in Genoa, her mother's birthplace. After acting in some amateur dramatics, she studied drama under Teresa Franchini, with whom she also made her professional debut on stage at 30 years old. In films, she was mainly active in supporting roles in adventure and peplum genres, sometimes credited as Manuela Kent. She retired from acting in the mid-1960s. In 1959, she was the author of the book Cina senza muraglia, and in 1969, she wrote the film Mr. Superinvisible, being credited as Mary Eller.

Personal life 
In 1939, Rocca married Giuseppe Bisazza, and they had a son, Oreste. In 1948 she remarried to Communist politician Umberto Terracini.

Rocca died in a clinic in Rome, following a long illness, in 1999, at 81 years old.

Selected filmography 
 Attention! Bandits! (1951)
 Article 519, Penal Code (1952)
 At the Edge of the City (1953)  
 For You I Have Sinned (1953)
 Love Song (1954)
 Love in Rome (1960)
 L'oro di Roma (1961) 
 The Fury of Achilles (1962)
 Imperial Venus (1962)
 The Fall of Rome (1963)
 Secret of the Sphinx (1964)
 Messalina vs. the Son of Hercules (1964)
 Lo scippo (1965)
 Captain from Toledo (1965)

References

External links 
 

1917 births
1999 deaths
Italian film actresses
Italian stage actresses
20th-century Italian actresses
People from the Province of Udine
20th-century Italian women writers